"In Your Eyes" is a love ballad by Irish singer Niamh Kavanagh which won the Eurovision Song Contest 1993 for , scoring a total of 187 points. It was written and composed by Jimmy Walsh.

In the song, the singer tells how, after being lonely, she has found love and heaven in her lover's arms and how it has changed her.

Overview 
In 1992, Walsh, who was based in New York, recorded a demo of the song in a studio there. One of the engineers suggested a girl singer who he knew to record it. A then-unknown Idina Menzel came in and listened to the song. She suggested a key change for the chorus as she found it rather flat. Walsh was concerned that this would make the song too difficult to sing, but Menzel insisted she could do it. She duly recorded the demo and this was sent to Niamh Kavanagh, who was recommended to Walsh as being a singer who could handle the difficult ranges within the song. Kavanagh loved it, but was unsure of wanting to compete in Eurovision. Eventually, Walsh said that he would withdraw the song if she did not do it, so she agreed to enter with it.

Kavanagh had a home win, since the contest took place in Ireland due to Linda Martin's win . The song was performed fourteenth on the night, following 's Arvingarna with "Eloise" and preceding 's Modern Times with "Donne-moi une chance". At the close of voting, it had received 187 points, first in a field of 25.

Despite winning the Irish national song contest, Kavanagh found it difficult to find a record label willing to release the record due to its association with the contest. Eventually, she partly funded the recording herself and released it in limited numbers in Ireland under a made-up label name, Eureyes Music. During the run-up to the contest, she met Simon Cowell, who was present with the UK entrant Sonia. He signed her up to Arista Records and the song was released internationally by them. "In Your Eyes" was the best selling single in Ireland in 1993. It also reached No. 24 in the UK Singles Chart and was a minor hit in the Netherlands and Germany.

It was not until 2017, during a documentary on the Irish winners, that Kavanagh learned that the singer on the demo she had heard all those years ago was a young Idina Menzel, who was by then internationally famous.

Critical reception 
Alan Jones from Music Week wrote that "the winner of the 1993 Eurovision Song Contest has lots of old-fashioned qualities – it's a good song well sung by a striking colleen". He added, "Kavanagh is a talented and gutsy singer."

Track listing 
"In Your Eyes" (Walsh) - 3:10
"In Your Eyes (instrumental)" (Walsh) - 3:09

Charts

References

External links
"In Your Eyes" lyrics

1990s ballads
Eurovision songs of 1993
Eurovision songs of Ireland
Eurovision Song Contest winning songs
Irish Singles Chart number-one singles
1993 songs
Niamh Kavanagh songs